Keni Doidoi (born 26 November 1976) is an association football player from Fiji. He plays as a midfielder and has played football with Fijian National Football League club Ba FC since 1998.

External links 
 

1976 births
Living people
Fijian footballers
Fiji international footballers
Association football midfielders
Ba F.C. players
People from Ba Province
I-Taukei Fijian people
2002 OFC Nations Cup players